Sri Krishna Vijayamu is a 1971 Indian Telugu-language Hindu mythological film produced by M. S. Reddy under the Kaumudi Art Pictures banner and directed by Kamalakara Kameswara Rao. It stars N. T. Rama Rao and Jayalalithaa, with music composed by Pendyala Nageswara Rao. The film was recorded as a flop at the box office. It was dubbed into Hindi as Hare Krishna in 1974.

Plot
The film begins with Lord Krishna sending his brother Satyaki as a mediator to Kalayavana with a gift of a vessel containing a snake, which indicates dealing with he is playing with a snake. Kalayavana sends it as a return gift to Krishna, where the snake has been killed by ants replying that a snake can be killed by ants. But when they open the vessel the snake is alive and Krishna warns them to be careful. Listening to it, Kalayavana is enraged when Sage Narada departs and notifies the whereabouts of Krishna. Kalayavana reaches there, and Krishna cleverly takes him into a cave and makes him kick a saint, Muchikunda. In anger, Muchikunda burns him into ashes with his vision. Knowing it, Mahodara the twin brother of Kalayavana burns for vengeance, but Narada says that it's not the right time and he requires finesse.

Hence Mahodora performs a huge penance for Lord Siva and acquires a boon that he will not die by any weapon used by others. Meanwhile, on the occasion of Krishna's birthday, his eight wives present eight gems when Narada stirs a quarrel by telling him that it would be more beautiful if it would be one more gem, as an intention that Krishna should have one more wife. Here Lord Krishna assures Narada that his wish will be fulfilled soon. Parallelly, Mahodara wins over the entire universe and creates a lot of atrocities. Hearing the miseries of the victims, Goddess Saraswathi asks Lord Brahma when will be the end to this anarchy and he replies that the time is imminent. Brahma creates a beautiful girl called Vasundhara with a ring, by which she will be a girl to women and a statue to men, except for her fiancé. After her marriage, if any other men try to remove the ring, it transforms into a weapon and kills him.

After that, Brahma calls Narada and asks him to be her foster father. Once Mahodara sees Vasundhara and wants to possess her. Being aware of it, Narada takes Vasundhara to Dwaraka and asks Rukmini to safeguard her for a few days, when she is hesitating he tells her the secret of the ring and she agrees. At the same time, Krishna & Satyabhama return after defeating Narakasura. Sri Krishna can see Vasundhara because he is her fiancé, every day he silently meets Vasundhara and they love him mutually. Satyabhama senses it, becomes furious, and keeps Vasundhara in prison. Now Mahodara's ploy provokes Pundarika Vasudeva to keep Kuchela in his custody to eliminate Krishna. Krishna moves to his rescue and safeguards him by eliminating Pundarika Vasudeva. Exploiting it, Mahodara attacks Dwaraka and grabs Vasundhara when Krishna returns and learns about the situation. Eventually, Mahodara is making his marriage arrangements with Vasundhara. Krishna reaches there as a Brahmin cleverly marries Vasundhara and puts the ring back on her finger. Angered, Mahodara throws it away, which turns into a weapon and kills him because it is a weapon used by himself. Finally, Krishna reaches Dwaraka along with Vasundhara and the movie ends on a happy note.

Cast

N. T. Rama Rao as Lord Krishna
Jayalalithaa as Vasundhara
S. V. Ranga Rao as Mahodara & Kalayavana (dual role)
Kanta Rao as Narada Maharshi 
Mikkilineni as Balarama
Dhulipala as Muchukunda
Rajanala as Lord Siva
Satyanarayana
Nagabhushanam as Paundraka Vasudeva 
Ramakrishna as Satyaki
Prabhakar Reddy as Lord Brahma
Padmanabham as Kudi Bhujam
Allu Ramalingaiah as Vasanthaka
Tyagaraju as Indra
Jamuna as Satyabhama 
Devika as Rukmini
Hema Malini as Rambha
Rama Prabha as Goddess Saraswati
Sandhya Rani as Lakshana
Prasanna Rani as Chaturika 
Sriranjani Jr. as Vamakshi 
Jayasri as Jambavati

Soundtrack

Music composed by Pendyala Nageswara Rao.

References

External links
 

1971 films
1970s Telugu-language films
Hindu mythological films
Films directed by Kamalakara Kameswara Rao
Films scored by Pendyala Nageswara Rao
Films about Krishna
Films based on the Bhagavata Purana